The William Haner Polygonal Barn was a historic building located near Pisgah in rural Harrison County, Iowa, United States. It was built in 1912 by Comstock Construction. The 12-sided structure measured  in diameter and featured white horizontal siding with a block foundation, a two-pitch roof, and a large hay dormer on the south side. It was originally used as a Purebred Hereford cattle barn. The barn was listed on the National Register of Historic Places in 1986. It was destroyed in a fire caused by lightning in 2002.

References

Infrastructure completed in 1912
Polygonal barns in the United States
Barns on the National Register of Historic Places in Iowa
National Register of Historic Places in Harrison County, Iowa
Buildings and structures in Harrison County, Iowa
1912 establishments in Iowa
Buildings and structures demolished in 2002
2002 disestablishments in Iowa